Barry G. Webb is a scholar and senior research fellow in Old Testament at Moore Theological College. He is the author of a number of scholarly books; foremost is the commentary on The Book of Judges in the New International Commentary on the Old Testament series. Numerous scholarly journals and academic religious periodicals have included articles by Webb.

Education
He earned his B.A. at Queensland University in 1966 and a further Dip.Ed. there in 1967. He went on to Melbourne University and gained a L.Th. in 1973. He studied at Australian College of Theology before earning a BD (Hons) from the University of London in 1977. Eventually gaining his Ph.D. at Sheffield University in 1985.

Career
Webb's The Book of the Judges: An Integrated Reading (2008) has been described as a "landmark in the study of Judges".

Webb serves as assistant editor of Reformed Theological Review academic journal.

Selected works

Books

Articles

References

External links
Barry G. Webb Moore College faculty Page

Living people
Academic staff of Moore Theological College
University of Queensland alumni
University of Melbourne alumni

Alumni of the University of London
Alumni of the University of Sheffield
Bible commentators
Old Testament scholars
Australian biblical scholars
Year of birth missing (living people)